Manzil is a 1936 Hindi film from New Theatres. A bilingual made in Hindi and Bengali (Grihadah),  it was directed by P.C. Barua from a story by Saratchandra Chattopadhyay. The dialogues and lyrics were by Arzu Lucknowi and music composed by R. C. Boral and Pankaj Mullick. The cast included Prithviraj Kapoor, Jamuna, Pahari Sanyal, Molina Devi, K. C. Dey and Boken Chatto. The story, a love triangle, revolves around two friends Mahim and Suresh and the girl they both love, Achala.

Plot
Mahim and Suresh are childhood friends, both in love with Achala. Suresh is rich but adheres to conventional values while Mahim is from a poor family but well-educated. Achala has been given a liberal Brahmo Samaj upbringing. Though fond of both friends, she chooses to marry Mahim and they shift to a village. Achala gradually becomes dissatisfied. Their house burns down and Mahim falls ill. Suresh arrives to nurse Mahim back to health and goes with them to a health resort for Mahim to recover. Achala is attracted to Suresh and they both elope. She later returns to Mahim who forgives her.

Cast
Jamuna: Achala
Pahari Sanyal: Mahim
Prithviraj Kapoor: Suresh
K. C. Dey
Molina Devi
Boken Chatto
Nemo

References

External links

1936 films
1930s Hindi-language films
Indian drama films
1936 drama films
Indian black-and-white films
Hindi-language drama films
Films scored by Pankaj Mullick
Films scored by R. C. Boral